Daniel Morrison Jarvis was a Canadian politician, who represented the riding of North Vancouver-Seymour in the Legislative Assembly of British Columbia from 1991 to 2009. He was a member of the British Columbia Liberal Party.

References

External links
 Daniel Jarvis

1935 births
2021 deaths
British Columbia Liberal Party MLAs
Politicians from Vancouver
21st-century Canadian politicians